New Day Films is a U.S. film distribution company based in Newburgh, New York that serves the non-theatrical market (colleges and universities, libraries, high schools, and community groups).

History
Founded in 1971 by Julia Reichert and James Klein, New Day operates as a cooperative, consisting of more than 100 filmmaker members and a management team elected from the membership.

Films
New Day's titles fall into such categories as Multiculturalism and Diversity; Social and Political History; Gender and Socialization; Media, Art, and Culture; Physical and Mental Health; Parenting and Family; and Global Concerns.

The company's titles include the Academy Award-winning documentary short subject Witness to War: Dr. Charlie Clements. It has also distributed nine Academy Award-nominated films including The Collector of Bedford Street, With Babies and Banners: Story of the Women's Emergency Brigade, and four Emmy Award-winning titles, as well as films that have been broadcast on P.O.V., Independent Lens, HBO and other national programs.

The company distributes the films of academic filmmakers such as Joanne Hershfield.

References

External links
New Day Films

Film distributors of the United States
Artist cooperatives in the United States
Documentary film organizations
Filmmaker cooperatives